Wagad Mogadishu is a Somali football club based in Mogadishu, Somalia which currently plays in Somali Second Division the second division of Somali Football.

Stadium 
Currently the team plays at the 15,000 capacity Banadir Stadium.

Honours
Somalia League
Champion (4): 1982, 1985, 1987, 1988

References

External links
 Team profile - scoreshelf.com

Football clubs in Somalia